The 2012–13 season of the Norwegian Premier League, the highest bandy league for men in Norway.

Eighteen games were played, with 2 points given for wins and 1 for draws. Stabæk won the league, whereas Drammen and Høvik survived a relegation playoff.

League table

References

Seasons in Norwegian bandy
2013 in bandy
2012 in bandy
Band
Band